Allium simillimum, the Simil Onion, or dwarf onion, is a plant species native to Idaho and Montana (Gallatin and Ravalli Counties). It grows on sandy soils at high elevations in the mountains, 1800–3400 m.

Allium simillimum produces egg-shaped bulbs up to 1.7 cm long. Flowering stalks are rarely more than 5 cm tall. Flowers are bell-shaped, up to 10 mm across; tepals white with green or pink midribs; anthers purple; pollen white or gray.

References

simillimum
Flora of Idaho
Onions
Plants described in 1900
Flora of Montana
Taxa named by Louis Forniquet Henderson